Makara is the name of a zodiac sign in Indian languages known as Capricorn in English. "Jyoti" means "light" in Sanskrit. Thus "Makara Jyoti" (also spelt as Jyothi) means "Light of Capricorn".

The Sun appears to move from one zodiac constellation to another every month and the day on which Sun changes the constellation is called Sankrānti ("transit") in Sanskrit.  Makara Sankranti is the Sun’s transit into Capricorn (Makara) constellation that usually occurs on 14 January every year and is a very important Hindu festival celebrated all over India in various forms. Uttarāyaṇa, the six-month period when the sun travels towards the north on the celestial sphere, starts on Makara Sankranti and ends on Karka Sankranti (around 14 July).

One of the places where a large number of devout Hindus reach on 14 January for worship is Sabarimala located in thick rain forests of Kerala.

Makara Jyothi is a star which is worshiped by pilgrims in huge numbers at Sabarimala Temple in Kerala on Makara Sankranti on 14 January every year. It is believed that the deity Ayyappan asserts himself as Makara Jyothi to bless his devotees.

Makara Vilakku
Makara jyothi is the Sirius star which comes on 14 January on makara Sankranti.

The makaravilakku will come from Ponnambalemedu which is 4 km from sabarimala between 06:00pm to 08:00pm . 

Makaravilakku  is a light which that appears thrice on the Ponnambalamedu hill, four km away to the temple. In earlier years , it was a pooja performed by tribesmen (mala araya) on the day of makarajyothi at ponnambalamedu. Now it is done by Kerala government with the support of Travancore devosom board and forest department. Kerala high court confirmed the fact. The 'Makaravilakku' at Kerala's famous Sabarimala temple is man-made, as confirmed by the Travancore Devaswom Board (TDB) that runs the temple in the Periyar Tiger Reserve (PTR), in its submission to the Kerala High Court.
The board told the court that since it is a traditional ritual, it could not be done away with. A bench comprising justices Thottathil Radhakrishnan and Shekhar allowed the board's plea to conduct deeparadhana (evening pooja) instead of Makaravilakku at Ponnambalamedu, where the light appears.
The court held that in view of the board's admission about the Makaravilakku, there is no need for further investigations into the matter.

Popularity of the Ritual 

Lord Sri Rama and his brother Lakshmana met Sabari, an ardent devotee, at Sabarimala. Sabari offered the Lord fruits after tasting them. But the Lord accepted them gladly and whole-heartedly. The Lord then turned and saw a divine person doing tapas. He asked Sabari who it was. Sabari said it was Sasta. Rama walked towards Sasta and the latter stood up to welcome Prince Ram. The anniversary of this incident is celebrated on Makara Vilakku day. It is believed that on Makara Vilakku day, Lord Dharmasasta stops his tapas to bless his devotees.

The most famous Ayyappa shrine in India is the one at Sabarimala with over 50 million devotees visiting it every year..

The huge crowd of pilgrims that witnesses the event has been on the rise every year. It is believed that 1.5 million devotees witnessed Makarajyoti light in 2010. The revenue collection during the Makaravilakku period was also higher compared to previous years. The total donations were Rs.720 million in 2008 against previous year’s Rs.723 million.

Sabarimala stampedes and authenticity debate

In 1999 and 2011, two major human stampedes occurred on 14 January, Makara Jyothi Day at Sabarimala, killing 53 and 106 people respectively.  

. In 1999 the Justice T Chandrasekhara Menon committee that investigated the stampede refrained from going into the details of authenticity of 'Makara Jyothi'. Committee stated that Makarajyothi is a matter of belief and can't be probed. Justice Chanadrasekhara Menon had probed the veracity of makarajyothi during that time. He also appointed an advocate of the commission to witness the makarajyothi.

In 2011 another human stampede occurred on 14 January, Makara Jyothi Day at Sabarimala. It broke out during an annual pilgrimage, killing 102 pilgrims and injuring more than 100.
Amid a renewed debate after this stampede, Kerala High Court wanted to know whether or not the ‘Makarajyothi’ is a man-made phenomenon, asking about the authenticity of the hallowed celestial light visible from Sabarimala. "A distinction has to be made between the Makaravilakku and Makara Jyothi. The Jyothi is a celestial star. Makarvilakku is lit [by people],' said the head of the Thazamon Thanthri family, Kantararu Maheswararu. After this Travancore Devaswom Board (TDB) said that it was known to most believers that it was a man lit-fire, but there was a Hindu belief behind it. "It is known to everybody that Makara Jyothi is a fire lit up by men at Ponnabalamedu and TDB also recognises this', TDB President M Rajagoplan Nair told reporters on 31 January 2011.

References

External links 
Official website of Travancore Devaswom Board
Clarification of the matter by Minister
Minister G.Sudhakaran on Makara Vilakku / Makara Jyothi

Fire deities
Hindu festivals in Kerala
Festivals in Pathanamthitta district